Shanti Ashrama is a spiritual retreat located in the Upper San Antonio Valley in unincorporated Santa Clara County, California, United States as a branch of the Ramakrishna Mission.

History 

The land was gifted to the Vedanta Society at the turn of the 20th century, as a place for meditation and contemplation. A meditation cabin there serves as the site for annual retreats.

References

External links 
 Map of Ashrama, California

Unincorporated communities in California
Unincorporated communities in Santa Clara County, California
Spiritual retreats